Las Tunas is a city and municipality in central-eastern Cuba. It is the capital of the Las Tunas Province and was named Victoria de Las Tunas from 1869 to 1976.

Geography
The city of Las Tunas is located in along the Carretera Central (highway), between the cities of Camagüey, Holguín and Bayamo.

In 1943 the municipality was divided into the barrios of Primero, Segundo, Antonio Machado, Arenas, Caisimú, Cauto del Paso, Cuaba, Curana, Dumañuecos, Ojo de Agua, Oriente, Palmarito, Playuelas and San José de la Plata. The city is currently divided into the repartos (wards) of Primero (city centre), Segundo, La Victoria, Aguilera, Santo Domingo, Pena, La Loma, Aurora, Velázquez, Sosa, Casa Piedra, Israel Santos, Buena Vista, Alturas de Buena Vista, Propulsión, Aeropuerto and Reparto Militar.

History
The city was founded in 1796 around the Parish of San Jerónimo. In 1853, after a Royal Decree, it received the title of "city". In 1976, following the suppression of the Oriente Province and its split up, Las Tunas became the capital of the new and eponymous province.

Demographics
In 2004, the municipality of Las Tunas had a population of 187,438.

Climate
Las Tunas has a tropical savannah climate (Aw) with hot daytime temperatures and mild to warm night time temperatures year round.

Transport

Las Tunas counts a railway station on the principal Havana–Santiago de Cuba line and on a secondary line to Manatí. A planned extension of the A1 motorway, that will span the entire island, will interest the City. The local airport is the Hermanos Ameijeiras, located in the northern suburb.

Tourism
Known in Cuba as the "City of Sculpture" (due to the several artistic installations scattered throughout the city centre) Las Tunas is in the least visited province in Cuba. In spite of this, the city has two international hotels (Hotel Las Tunas and Hotel Cadillac) and 219 B&Bs 

However, the local and the central government are both working in order to increase tourism in the province.  In July 2015, within the framework of the Foreign Investment Law, the government is trying to attract foreign partners to build large hotel complexes in the still unspoilt Covarrubia beach.

Sport
The local baseball club is Las Tunas, nicknamed Leñadores (meaning “Lumberjacks”) and its home ground is the Julio Antonio Mella Stadium. The association football club is the FC Las Tunas, and its home ground is the Ovidio Torres Stadium.

Notable residents
 Yaquelín Abdalá (born 1968), visual artist
 Yordan Álvarez (born 1997), Major League Baseball player, and former Leñadores member
 Vicente Garcia González (1833–1886) General in the Cuban Ten Years' War

Twin towns
 Arroyo Seco (Querétaro, Mexico)

See also

Hermanos Ameijeiras Airport
Municipalities of Cuba
List of cities in Cuba

References

External links

 Las Tunas on EcuRed
 Las Tunas on Guije website
 Las Tunas on YourCasaParticular website

 
Cities in Cuba
Populated places in Las Tunas Province
Populated places established in 1759